Peter Adolph Rostgaard Bruun Gad   (25 November 1846 – 26 February 1907)  was a Danish ophthalmologist who founded the first eye infirmary of São Paulo city, Brazil, at the "Santa Casa de Sao Paulo" hospital, in 1885. This eye infirmary became the first ophthalmology school of São Paulo. Doctor Gad also worked in Rio de Janeiro and Copenhagen.

References

1846 births
1907 deaths
Danish ophthalmologists